Xiaoxia (Mandarin: 小峡镇) is a town in Ping'an District, Haidong, Qinghai, China. In 2010, Xiaoxia had a total population of 10,623: 5,497 males and 5,126 females: 2,101 aged under 14, 7,840 aged between 15 and 65 and 682 aged over 65.

References 
 

Township-level divisions of Qinghai
Ping'an District
Towns in China